Kristina Adolphson (born 2 September 1937) is a Swedish film actress. She was born in Stockholm, Sweden. She is the daughter of the actor Edvin Adolphson and the actress Mildred Mehle, and the sister of the singer Olle Adolphson. She was married to the actor Erland Josephson.

Selected filmography
 The Beat of Wings in the Night (1953)
 Young Summer (1954)
 The Unicorn (1955)
 The Dance Hall (1955)
 When the Mills are Running (1956)
 Brink of Life (1958)
 The Devil's Eye (1960)
 The Pleasure Garden (1961)
 Face to Face (1976)
 Marmalade Revolution (1980)
 Fanny and Alexander (1982)
 Private Confessions (1996)

References

External links

1937 births
Living people
Actresses from Stockholm
Swedish film actresses
Litteris et Artibus recipients
20th-century Swedish actresses